Jessica Makwenda (born 21 October 2005 in Lilongwe) is a Malawian swimmer. She was one of five Malawian sportspeople to take part in the 2020 Summer Olympics.

She carried the Malawian flag in the Parade of Nations at the 2020 Summer Olympics opening ceremony along with archer Areneo David. She competed in the women's 50m freestyle, allocated to Heat 4 on 30 July.

References

Externnal links
 

2005 births
Living people
Malawian female freestyle swimmers
Olympic swimmers of Malawi
Swimmers at the 2020 Summer Olympics
Swimmers at the 2022 Commonwealth Games
Commonwealth Games competitors for Malawi
21st-century Malawian women